Lower Macdonald is a hamlet village of Sydney, in the state of New South Wales, Australia. It is in the City of Hawkesbury north-west of Wisemans Ferry on the Macdonald River near its confluence with the Hawkesbury River.

References

Suburbs of Sydney
City of Hawkesbury
Hawkesbury River